Bernt Thomas Magnuson (also Magnusson, born 2 July 1950) is a retired Swedish cross-country skier. He competed at the 1972 Winter Olympics in the 30 km and the 4 × 10 km relay and placed 28th and fourth, respectively. He won three medals at the FIS Nordic World Ski Championships, including golds in the 30 km (1974) and the 4 × 10 km relay (1978) and a bronze in the 50 km (1974). Magnusson also won the 50 km event at the 1977 Holmenkollen ski festival.

Cross-country skiing results
All results are sourced from the International Ski Federation (FIS).

Olympic Games

World Championships
 3 medals – (2 gold, 1 bronze)

References

External links 
 
 Holmenkollen winners since 1892 – click "Vinnere" for downloadable pdf file 

1950 births
Living people
Holmenkollen Ski Festival winners
Swedish male cross-country skiers
FIS Nordic World Ski Championships medalists in cross-country skiing
Delsbo IF skiers
People from Motala Municipality
Olympic cross-country skiers of Sweden
Cross-country skiers at the 1972 Winter Olympics